Einar Sagstuen (born March 22, 1951) is a Norwegian cross-country skier who competed during the 1970s. He won the silver medal in the 4 × 10km relay at the 1976 Winter Olympics in Innsbruck.

Cross-country skiing results

Olympic Games
 1 medal – (1 silver)

References 

Norwegian male cross-country skiers
Olympic cross-country skiers of Norway
Olympic silver medalists for Norway
1951 births
Living people
Cross-country skiers at the 1976 Winter Olympics
Olympic medalists in cross-country skiing
Medalists at the 1976 Winter Olympics
Sportspeople from Gjøvik